Rupen Zartarian or Ruben Zardaryan (1874 – 16 August 1915) was an Armenian writer, educator, and political activist. He was killed by Ottoman authorities during the Armenian genocide.

Life 

Zartarian was born in 1874 in the city of Diyarbekir, but moved to Harput (or Kharpert) (Armenian: Խարբերդ) when he was two. He received his education from the educational institutions of that city.

Zartarian became a student of Tlgadintsi (Hovhannes Harutiunian, 1910–1912), who was a leading figure in rural Armenian literature. Tlgandintsi was also killed by Ottoman authorities during the Armenian Genocide. Zartarian was greatly influenced by his mentor, and his writing career stemmed from the encouragement he obtained. At the age of 18, he started teaching, and for the following decade, he continued in the field of education. At first, he taught at Tlgandinsti's institution, he then spent three years in French religious institutes.

In 1903, Zartarian was arrested by the Ottoman government and subsequently forced to leave the country because of his political activity. He established himself in Bulgaria and in 1906, founded a new newspaper called Razmik. When writing for the newspaper, Zartarian would often reiterate the need for Armenian nationals living outside their homeland to pursue working towards the ultimate goal of an autonomous Armenia. In 1908, he returned to Constantinople, along with many other Armenian intellectuals. A year later, Zartarian worked for the newspaper Azatamart while teaching at the Central Academy.

During the Armenian genocide, Zartarian was taken to Ayaş and kept in prison on 5 May and later taken under military escort to Diyarbakır to appear before a court martial there and was murdered by Cherkes Ahmet, and lieutenants Halil and Nazım, at a locality called Karacaören shortly before arriving to Diyarbekir.

Works 
Zartarian started writing poems at the age of 11, and his articles were published in many newspapers. In 1910, he released a volume called nocturnal clarity (ts'ayglos, Armenian: Ցայգլոս) that was subsequently translated in French. Many of his works were collected by a group called "The Friends of Fallen Authors" and released as a volume in 1930 in Paris.

Zartarian's duties as an editor often hindered his creativity as a writer. He had many responsibilities and he would have surely produced more books had he been free of them.

Some of his stories include:
The Petrified (Karatsadznere, Armenian: Քարացածները),
The Lake's Bride (Dzovagin Harse, Armenian: Ծովակին հարսը),
Flowers, Red Flowers (Dzaghigner Garmir Dzaghigner, Armenian: Ծաղիկներ, կարմիր ծաղիկներ),
The Injured Hunter (Zarnevadz Vorsorte Armenian: Զարնուած որսորդը)
The Prisoner's Tear (Prnavorin Artsoonke Armenian: Բռնաւորին արցունքը)
HomeLove (Dan Ser Armenian: Տան սէր)

All of these narratives are a mixture of ordinary life situations and fiction. Zartarian was able to cultivate this mixture in a new and very interesting way. His poetry usually focused on the beauty of nature. It can almost be said that he was the fore figure in this new genre of the Armenian literature scene.

Writing style 
Zartarian was a great figure from the rural Armenian scene. He was a true admirer of beauty and always wrote with a somewhat critical viewpoint. He wrote in Western Armenian and was a true connoisseur of the language. Zartarian's writing style was one of finesse and very delicate depictions. Erukhan described his writing as the cleanest, most opulent and haughtiest of their time.

Inspiration was a key element for this author. Zartarian often said that the pages on his desk would remain unfilled until he would feel inspired enough to write. He was never in a rush to write and did not see it as a job, but rather as stimulating work. Being more of poet by nature, Zartarian's works are peppered with poetic influences. His love of poetry contributed significantly to the splendor of his works.

References
Translated from Armenian: N.A. Արդի հայական գրականութիւն
Բ հատոր, [Modern Armenian literature], 2002, pg. 50-53

See also

Armenian genocide
Armenian notables deported from the Ottoman capital in 1915
Krikor Zohrab
Erukhan
Siamanto

1874 births
1915 deaths
People from Diyarbakır
19th-century male writers
20th-century male writers
Armenian male poets
19th-century Armenian poets
20th-century Armenian poets
People who died in the Armenian genocide
Journalists killed in the Ottoman Empire
Armenians from the Ottoman Empire
Writers from the Ottoman Empire